Persistent may refer to:
 Persistent data
 Persistent data structure
 Persistent identifier
 Persistent memory
 Persistent organic pollutant
 Persistent Systems, a technology company
 USS Persistent, three United States Navy ships

See also 

 The Persistence of Memory (disambiguation)
 Persistence (disambiguation)
 

Stereotypes